Monique Chaumette (born 4 April 1927) is a French actress. She appeared in more than forty films since 1958. She was married to Philippe Noiret from 1962 until his death in 2006.

Selected filmography

References

External links
 

1927 births
Living people
Actresses from Paris
French film actresses